For the Sholay film character, see the article on Mac Mohan – the actor who played the role. For the city in Jammu and Kashmir, see Samba, Jammu.

Sambha is a village in the Palghar district of Maharashtra, India. It is located in the Talasari taluka.

Demographics 

According to the 2011 census of India, Sambha has 825 households. The effective literacy rate (i.e. the literacy rate of population excluding children aged 6 and below) is 66.63%.

References 

Villages in Talasari taluka